Milliken may refer to:

Places
 Milliken, Colorado, a town in the United States
Milliken, West Virginia, an unincorporated community in the United States
 Milliken, Ontario, a neighbourhood of Toronto, Canada
 Milliken GO Station, a station in the GO Transit network located in the community
 Milliken Creek (disambiguation)
 Milliken Park railway station, Renfrewshire, Scotland, United Kingdom

People
Milliken (surname)

Other
 Milliken & Company, one of the world's largest private textile firms
 Milliken v. Bradley, a US Supreme Court decision on desegregation 
 Milliken Gallery, a contemporary art gallery in Stockholm

See also
 Millikan (disambiguation)
 Millikin (disambiguation)